Budapest Declaration could refer to:
 Budapest Memorandum on Security Assurances of 1994, regarding Ukraine
 International Union of Food Science and Technology Budapest Declaration of 1995
 Budapest Open Access Initiative declaration of 2002
 Budapest Declaration on Machine Readable Travel Documents of 2006